Verningen is a village in the municipality of Larvik, Norway. Its population (SSB 2005) is 806.

References

Villages in Vestfold og Telemark